The 1953 Lafayette Leopards football team was an American football team that represented Lafayette College in the Middle Three Conference during the 1953 college football season. In its second season under head coach Steve Hokuf, the team compiled a 5–4 record. Joseph O'Lenic was the team captain. The team played its home games at Fisher Field in Easton, Pennsylvania.

Schedule

References

Lafayette
Lafayette Leopards football seasons
Lafayette Leopards football